The Hunza District is one of the 14 districts of the Pakistani province of Gilgit-Baltistan. It was established in 2015 by the division of the Hunza–Nagar District in accordance with a government decision to establish more administrative units in Gilgit-Baltistan. The district headquarters is the town of Karimabad.

Geography 

The Hunza District is bounded on the north and east by the Kashgar Prefecture of China's Xinjiang Uyghur Autonomous Region, on the south by the Nagar District and the Shigar District, on the west by the Ghizer District, and on the north-west by the Wakhan District of Afghanistan's Badakhshan Province. The Hunza District represents the northernmost region of the Indian subcontinent. It is home to the historic passes through the Karakoram Mountains (the Killik, Mintaka, Khunjerab, and Shimshal passes) through which trade and religion passed between Central Asia, China, and India for centuries. The present-day Karakoram Highway passes through the Khunjerab Pass to enter China's Xinjiang Uyghur Autonomous Region.

History 
Historian Ahmad Hassan Dani established that the Sakas (Scythians) used the Karakoram route to invade Taxila. The Sacred Rock of Hunza has petroglyphs of mounted horsemen and ibex, along with Kharosthi inscriptions that list the names of Saka and Pahlava rulers. The rock also contains inscriptions from the Kushan period, showing the Saka and Kushan suzerainty over the Hunza and Gilgit regions.

Hunza began to separate from the Gilgit region as a separate state around 997 A.D., but decisive separation occurred with the establishment of the Ayash ruling family in the 15th century. The neighbouring Nagar state also separated in the same manner, and internecine battles between the two states were endemic. Following the invasion of Kashmir by the Mughul nobleman Mirza Haidar Dughlat, the Mir of Hunza established diplomatic relations with Kashgaria (Yarkand Khanate). After Kashgaria came under Chinese control, he continued relations with Kashgaria by paying an annual tribute of gold dust to the Chinese government in Yarkand. In return for that token tribute, Hunza enjoyed territorial rights in the Raskam Valley and grazing rights in the Taghdumbash Pamir.

After the British suzerainty was established over the Kashmir region in 1846, the British made Hunza subject to the Maharaja of Jammu and Kashmir. Thus Hunza was in the anomalous position of being subject to two sovereign powers at the same time, immensely complicating the relations between British India and the Chinese empire. The practice of tribute to China was eventually stopped in 1930.

After the partition of India into the present-day India and Pakistan in 1947, the Maharaja of Jammu and Kashmir acceded his state to India to in order to defend it against an invasion by Pakistani tribesmen. A rebellion in Gilgit then overthrew the Maharaja's authority. The Mir of Hunza subsequently acceded his state to Pakistan, but the accession was never formally accepted, due to the Kashmir dispute in the United Nations.

Administration 

Administratively, the Hunza District comprises two tehsils, the Aliabad Tehsil and the Gojal Tehsil. The villages of lower Hunza and central Hunza are located in the Aliabad Tehsil, whereas the villages from the Attabad Lake up to the Khunjerab Pass are located in the Gojal Tehsil. In lower Hunza, Shina is the main language, whereas in central Hunza, the dominant language is Burushashki, and in upper Hunza, Wakhi is the main language. District administration is exercised by the Deputy Commissioner (DC), with the assistance of an assistant commissioner. The Hunza police force is commanded by the Superintendent of Police (SP).

Religion
The majority of the population of Hunza District are Islam. With 89% are Shia Islam, 7% are Noorbakshia Islam, and 4% are Sunni Islam.

References

Bibliography 
 
 
 
 
 

 
Districts of Gilgit-Baltistan